The Supercars Hall of Fame is a collection of individuals and events that recognise the efforts of past champions and prominent figures within the Supercars Championship. A new inductee is announced annually at the championship's end of season gala dinner in November.

History
The Hall of Fame was instituted in 1999 with the first running of what was then known as the V8 Supercars Championship Series, initially known as the Shell Championship Series. The initial inductees were five-time Australian Touring Car Champion Ian Geoghegan and four-time champion Allan Moffat. Until 2011, all of the drivers inducted have been either Australian Touring Car champions or multiple winners of the Bathurst 1000 race. Two former drivers were inducted in each of 1999 to 2002 and in 2004, while 2003 and 2010 saw no inductees added. 2005 saw the controversial inclusion of an event instead of a driver, in the Adelaide 500, the traditional season opening event. The first individual who had not driven in the series to be added to the hall of fame was Tony Cochrane, the former chairman of the sport from 1997 until 2012. The most recent inductee was former team owner Tom Walkinshaw.

Inductees

References

Hall
Auto racing museums and halls of fame
Australian sports trophies and awards
Awards established in 1999
Halls of fame in Australia
1999 establishments in Australia